Bi Haoyang (born 11 October 2001) is a Chinese footballer currently playing as a defender for Hubei Istar, on loan from Hebei.

Club career
Born in Yunnan, Bi joined Hebei in 2017. For the 2021 season, he was loaned to China League Two side Hubei Istar, where he would go on to make his professional debut.

Career statistics

Club
.

Notes

References

2001 births
Living people
Chinese footballers
China youth international footballers
Association football defenders
China League Two players
Hebei F.C. players
Hubei Istar F.C. players
21st-century Chinese people